Snipes Mountain AVA is an American Viticultural Area located in the Yakima Valley of Washington State. It was approved by the Bureau of Alcohol, Tobacco, Firearms and Explosives on January 21, 2009 making it Washington's 10th federally designated AVA. It is the second smallest AVA in the state, after the Red Mountain AVA, and has one of the state's longest viticultural histories. The  appellation is a sub-AVA of the Yakima Valley AVA and the Columbia Valley AVA. It is located above and between the towns of Sunnyside and Granger around Outlook, Washington, in the southeast corner of the Yakima Valley.

Geography 
The viticultural area also includes Harrison Hill, which lies contiguously east of Snipes Mountain and has similar soil and topography.

The Snipes Mountain AVA, like much of Eastern Washington, is located in the rain shadow of the Cascade Mountains which contributes to the warm and dry climate of the region. Soil deposits below the area are composed of gravels and settlements left by ancient river beds that the Columbia River once followed. These deposits range in size from that of a human fist to large melons. The mountain itself was created by fault activity.

History 
Snipes Mountain, itself, was named for Ben Snipes, an early Yakima County pioneer who built a house at the base of a mountain in the 1850s and developed an expansive cattle operation.

The petition to create the Snipes Mountain AVA was filed by Upland Vineyards, which was first planted in 1917 by Washington State wine pioneer William B. Bridgman. The vineyard on Snipes Mountain was one of the first to plant the European Vitis vinifera varieties of Semillon and Pinot noir in Washington.

References 

American Viticultural Areas
Washington (state) wine
2009 establishments in Washington (state)
Geography of Yakima County, Washington